Véronique Ovaldé (born 1972) is a French novelist. Her fifth novel Et mon cœur transparent won the Prix France Culture/Télérama in 2008. Her seventh novel Ce que je sais de Vera Candida won the Prix Renaudot des lycéens (2009), the Prix France Télévisions (2009) and the Grand prix des lectrices de Elle (2010). She has had two books translated in English by Adriana Hunter, but Ovaldé's other titles are still available for interested publishers and translators.

She lives in Paris.

Works 
 2000: Le Sommeil des poissons, Éditions du Seuil
 2002: Toutes choses scintillant, L'Ampoule,
 2003: Les hommes en général me plaisent beaucoup, Actes Sud, J'ai lu, 2006
 2005: Déloger l’animal, Actes Sud (Translated by Adrian Hunter as Kick Out the Animal)
 2006: La Très Petite Zébuline with Joëlle Jolivet, Actes Sud junior
 2008: Et mon cœur transparent, éditions de l'Olivier (Translated by Adrian Hunter as And My See-Through Heart)
Prix France Culture/Télérama 2008
 2009: Ce que je sais de Vera Candida, éditions de l'Olivier
Prix Renaudot des Lycéens 2009
Prix France Télévisions 2009
Grand prix des lectrices de Elle 2010
 2009: La Salle de bains du Titanic, recueil de nouvelles hors-commerce, J'ai Lu.
 2011: Des vies d'oiseaux, éditions de l'Olivier
 2012: La Salle de bains du Titanic, recueil de nouvelles, édition augmentée et illustrée, J'ai Lu.
 2013: La Grâce des brigands, éditions de l'Olivier
 2015: Paloma et le vaste monde, avec Jeanne Detallante, Actes Sud junior
 Pépite du livre 2015, Catégorie Album (Salon du livre et de la presse jeunesse de Montreuil)
 2015: Quatre cœurs imparfaits, with Véronique Dorey, 
 2016  Soyez imprudents les enfants, Flammarion

References

20th-century French novelists
21st-century French novelists
French women novelists
21st-century French women writers
1972 births
Living people
Writers from Paris
20th-century French women writers
Prix Renaudot des lycéens winners